Pchelarovo may refer to the following places in Bulgaria:

Pchelarovo, Dobrich Province
Pchelarovo, Kardzhali Province